North City may refer to:

 North City, Amarna, Egypt
 North City, Illinois, United States
 North City, San Diego, California, United States
 North City, Shoreline, Washington, Washington, United States